Mastax kulti is a species of beetle in the family Carabidae with restricted distribution in the Kenya.

References

Mastax kulti
Beetles described in 1949
Beetles of Africa